Thomas John Bisika is a social demographer and public health specialist, diplomat, and former health systems specialist at World Health Organization in Nigeria.He is the current Malawi High Commissioner to the United Kingdom.

Academic career
He is the former Chief of Division responsible for Health, HIV/AIDS, Nutrition, other related infectious diseases and Population at the African Union Commission in Addis Ababa, Ethiopia. He was born on April 6, 1967 in Malawi. He is originally from Makanjira Village, TA Chikowi, Zomba District. He worked as a Programme Specialist for the United Nations Population Fund in the sub-regional office for Southern Africa in Johannesburg, South Africa as part of his career as a United Nations diplomat.

Before this he was a Senior Lecturer in health policy and management at the University of Pretoria School of Health Systems. From 1993 to 2005 he was a Research Fellow at the Centre for Social Research of the University of Malawi. During this period he also taught demography and sociology at Chancellor College, a constituent College of the University of Malawi. He studied at Chancellor College of the University of Malawi, Georgetown University in Washington, D.C., Johns Hopkins Bloomberg School of Public Health, University of Hawaiʻi, University of the Witwatersrand, Galilee College (Israel) and the University of South Africa. He holds a B.Sc. in Demography and Computer Science, a M.A. in Reproductive Health Demography and Statistics, a postgraduate certificate in Health Systems Management and Doctorate of Science in Medical Anthropology.

While a student at Chancellor College, he formed the Demography Student Association which he went on to become the founding President and was also the interim President of the Student Union of Chancellor College between 1992 and 1993. He is a member of the Population Association of America.

Charity work
With respect to charity work, Thomas Bisika was one of the youngest Malawians ever to have been inducted as a Member of the Lions Club International. From 1994 to 2001 Dr. Thomas Bisika was the chairperson of the National Health Sciences Research Committee which is the National Health Research Ethics Review Board for the Malawi Government and is housed in the Ministry of Health headquarters. In this capacity he approved a number of clinical trials and health related studies including the ones involving antiretroviral therapy. From 1998-2000 he was part of the Essential National Health Research network created under the auspices of Council for Health Research and Development (COHRED). In 2008 Dr Bisika was a member of the Positive Synergies between Global Health Initiatives and Health systems and is privileged to be a member of the Global Health Workforce Alliance (GHWA) and the Africa Platform on Human Resources for Health.

Awards
In 1999 Dr. Thomas John Bisika received The Gender Matters Award of the International Development Research Centre (IDRC) in Ottawa, Ontario, Canada. The money from this award was shared with the Centre for Social Research where he conducted the research on traditional eye medicine which earned him this award. Dr Bisika's name appeared in “Marquis Who's Who in the World 2010” and is a nominee for “2000 Outstanding Intellectuals of the 21st Century 2010”.

At the African Union Dr Bisika wrote speeches for H.E. Alpha Konare, Chairperson of the African Union Commission, and Advocate Bience Gawanas, Commissioner for Social Affairs. He was also instrumental in the elaboration of a number of African Union policy documents including the African Common Position on Migration and Development, Africa Health Strategy, Plan of Action on Violence Prevention, Policy Framework on Sexual and Reproductive Health and Rights, Maputo Plan of Action and the Pharmaceutical Manufacturing Plan for Africa. He was also a member of the drafting team which elaborated the Africa-EU Strategy that was adopted in Lisbon, Portugal during the second EU-Africa Summit in December 2007. In 2006 he led a team that produced the second State of the African Population Report which was adopted by the African Population Commission in June 2006 in Johannesburg, South Africa.

Dr Thomas Bisika is now the director of the National AIDS Commission of Malawi. Dr Thomas Bisika has also previously worked as a consultant for the World Food Programme, World Health Organization, United Nations Population Fund, Danish Red Cross, Danish International Development Agency, Population Services International, International Eye Foundation, Catholic Relief Services, National AIDS Commission (Malawi), Ministry of Health, Ministry of Tourism, Ministry of Labour, Ministry of Home Affairs and Ministry of Gender of the  Malawi Government and several NGOs including Project Hope, Banja La Mtsogolo and Emmanuel International.

Publications
Dr Bisika's has presented a number of papers at the Population Association of America (PAA). His scientific journal publications include:

1.	Bisika, Thomas, Ntata, P. and Konyani, S. 2009. Gender-violence and education in Malawi: a study of violence against girls as an obstruction to universal primary school education. Journal of Gender Studies. 18 (3): 299-306

2.	Bisika T, Konyani S, Chamangwana I, Khanyizira G. 2009. The Epidemiology of HIV among Drug Abusers in Malawi. African Journal of Drug and Alcohol Studies. 8(2): pages 126-131.

3.	Bisika, Thomas. 2009. A pilot study to evaluate the diagnostic accuracy of local terminology for malaria screening among children in rural Malawi. Malawi Medical Journal; 21(2): pages 56-58.

4.	Bisika, Thomas. 2008. Sexual and Reproductive Health and HIV/AIDS Risk Perception in the Tourism Industry: The Case of Malawi. Malawi Medical Journal; 21(2): pages 75-80.

5.	Bisika, Thomas. 2009. The potential acceptability of Microbicides in HIV prevention in Stable marital relationships in Malawi. Journal of Family Planning and Reproductive Health Care, 35(2): pages 115-117.

6.	Bisika, T., Courtright, P., Geneua, R., Kasote, A., Chimombo, L and Chirambo, M. 2009. Self treatment for eye diseases in Malawi. African Journal of Traditional, Complementary and Alternative Medicines. 6(1): pages 23-29.

7.	Bisika, Thomas. 2008. Do Social and Cultural Factors perpetuate Gender Based Violence in Malawi? Gender & Behaviour Volume 6 (2) 2008: pages 1884-1896.

8.	Bisika, T and G. Mandere. 2008. Integration of Nutritional in the Antiretroviral Therapy Scale up Plan for Malawi. September 2008; Malawi Medical Journal. 20(3): pages 93-98.

9.	Bisika, Thomas. 2008. The Effectiveness of the TBA Programme in Reducing Maternal Mortality and Morbidity in Malawi. East African Journal of Public Health Volume 5 (2) August 2008: pages 103-110.

10.	Bisika, Thomas. 2008. Cultural Factors that Affect Sexual and Reproductive Health in Malawi. Journal of Family Planning and Reproductive Health Care. 34 (2): pages 79-80, April 2008.

11.	Bisika, Thomas, Madeleine Short, Gold-Marie Wontumi, Jenny Truong, Amy Tsui. 2007. "Repositioning Family Planning To Reduce Unmet Need". African Renaissance Vol. 4 (3&4): pages 83-101.

12.	Valerie A. Paz Soldan, Thomas Bisika, Aimee Benson, Janine Barden-Ofallon, Joseph deGraft-Johnson. 2007. Social, Economic and Demographic Determinants of Sexual Risk Behaviors among Men in Rural Malawi. African Journal of Reproductive Health. 11(2): pages 33-46. August 2007.

13.	Janine Barden-Ofallon, Joseph deGraft-Johnson, Thomas Bisika, Aimee Benson and Amy Tsui. 2004. Factors associated with HIV/AIDS Knowledge and Risk Perception in Rural Malawi. AIDS and Behavior. 8(2): pages 131-140. June 2004.

References
IUSSP.org
https://web.archive.org/web/20070715081339/http://www.pop.psu.edu/general/pubs/PAA_Affairs/97_Spring/new_members.html 
http://www.ossrea.net/publications/newsletter/oct04/article8.htm 
Alumni list - Galillee College
https://web.archive.org/web/20070622104118/http://www2.eastwestcenter.org/research/popcomm/Participants.htm
https://web.archive.org/web/20120415004713/http://www.africa-union.org/
http://www.kaisernetwork.org/daily_reports/rep_index.cfm?DR_ID=40540
http://www.news-medical.net/?id=20628
https://web.archive.org/web/20061031170341/http://www.medicalnewstoday.com/medicalnews.php?newsid=54599&nfid=rssfeeds
https://web.archive.org/web/20110714065940/http://www.medilexicon.com/medicalnews.php?newsid=54599 
https://web.archive.org/web/20071008094953/http://quickstart.clari.net/voa/art/ez/2005-11-16-voa48.html
http://www.ingentaconnect.com/content/klu/aibe/2004/00000008/00000002

1967 births
Living people
People from Zomba District
Demographers
University of Malawi alumni
Georgetown University alumni
Johns Hopkins Bloomberg School of Public Health alumni
University of Hawaiʻi at Mānoa alumni
University of the Witwatersrand alumni
University of South Africa alumni
Academic staff of the University of Malawi
Academic staff of the University of Pretoria
Malawian demographers